This is a list of the 38 NFL players with at least 75 receiving touchdowns. Jerry Rice leads with 197, and also leads in postseason touchdowns with 22.

Players listed in bold are active NFL players.

Players with at least 75 touchdowns

Through the  season.

Active player with at least 70 receiving touchdowns
Through the  season; includes ranking.

Players with at least 10 postseason receiving touchdowns

Through  playoffs.

Historical receiving touchdowns leaders

Eleven players are recognized as having held outright or tied the record as the NFL's career receiving touchdowns leader. The longest record holder was Don Hutson who held the record for 49 years.

See also
NFL records (individual)
List of National Football League career receiving yards leaders
List of National Football League career receptions leaders
List of National Football League annual receiving touchdowns leaders

References
Career receiving touchdown leaders at profootballreference.com

receiving
Receiving touchdowns leaders
National Football League lists